{{DISPLAYTITLE:C7H16}}
The molecular formula C7H16 may refer to:

 Dimethylpentanes
 2,2-Dimethylpentane
 2,3-Dimethylpentane
 2,4-Dimethylpentane
 3,3-Dimethylpentane
 3-Ethylpentane
 Heptane
 Methylhexanes
 2-Methylhexane
 3-Methylhexane
 2,2,3-Trimethylbutane